
Gmina Zakrzewo is a rural gmina (administrative district) in Aleksandrów County, Kuyavian-Pomeranian Voivodeship, in north-central Poland.

Villages
Gmina Zakrzewo contains the villages and settlements of Bachorza, Gęsin, Gosławice, Kobielice, Kolonia Bodzanowska, Kuczkowo, Lepsze, Michałowo, Sędzin, Sędzin-Kolonia, Seroczki, Siniarzewo, Sinki, Ujma Duża, Wola Bachorna, Zakrzewo and Zarębowo.

Neighbouring gminas
Gmina Zakrzewo is bordered by the gminas of Bądkowo, Dąbrowa Biskupia, Dobre, Koneck and Osięciny.

References
 Polish official population figures 2006

Zakrzewo
Gmina Zakrzewo